Seluma Regency is a regency of Bengkulu Province, Indonesia, on the island of Sumatra. The regency seat is at the town of Pasar Tais. It covers an area of 2,479.36 km2, and had a population of 173,507 at the 2010 Census and 207,877 at the 2020 Census.

Bordering areas
The regency borders South Bengkulu Regency to the southeast, the Indian Ocean to the southwest, Bengkulu (city) and Central Bengkulu Regency to the northwest, and South Sumatra Province (Empat Lawang Regency and Lahat Regency) to the northeast.

Administrative districts 
The Regency is divided into fourteen districts, tabulated below with their areas and their populations at the 2010 Census and the 2020 Census. The table also includes the location of the district administrative centres, and the number of administrative villages (totalling 182 rural desa and 20 urban kelurahan) in each district.

References

Regencies of Bengkulu